The 2018 Arizona Wildcats baseball team represented the University of Arizona in the 2018 NCAA Division I baseball season. The Wildcats played their home games for the 7th season at Hi Corbett Field. The team was coached by Jay Johnson in his 3rd season at Arizona.

Personnel

Roster

Coaches

Opening day

Schedule and results

2018 MLB draft

References 

Arizona Wildcats
Arizona Wildcats baseball seasons
Arizona baseball